VTE may mean:
 Venous thromboembolism
 Vaishnava Training and Education
 Virtual Terminal Emulator, a widget used by programs such as GNOME Terminal
 Wattay International Airport (via IATA code), in Laos, near its capital Vientiane
 Vertical triple expansion, a type of multiple expansion steam engine
 Vancouver Transit Exchange, an Internet exchange point